Love Betrayed is a 1703 comedy play by the English writer William Burnaby. It is also known by the longer title Love Betray'd; Or, The Agreeable Disappointment. It was a reworking of Shakespeare's Twelfth Night.

The original cast included John Verbruggen as Moreno, George Powell as Drances, Barton Booth as Sebastian, Thomas Doggett as Taquilet, George Pack as Pedro, William Fieldhouse as Rodoregue, Elizabeth Barry as Villaretta, Abigail Lawson as Laura, Elinor Leigh as Dromia and Anne Bracegirdle as Caesario.

References

Bibliography
 Burling, William J. A Checklist of New Plays and Entertainments on the London Stage, 1700-1737. Fairleigh Dickinson Univ Press, 1992.
 Dobson, Michael. The Making of the National Poet : Shakespeare, Adaptation and Authorship, 1660-1769: Shakespeare, Adaptation and Authorship, 1660-1769. Clarendon Press, 1992.
 Nicoll, Allardyce. A History of Early Eighteenth Century Drama: 1700-1750. CUP Archive, 1927.

1703 plays
West End plays
Plays by William Burnaby